Eren Bali (born 1984, Malatya, Turkey) is a Kurdish engineer and technology entrepreneur.   based in the United States. He was the founding CEO of Udemy, a platform and marketplace for massive open online courses (MOOCs), and he is now the founder and CEO of Carbon Health, a primary healthcare franchise based in San Francisco.

Early life and education 

Eren Bali was born in 1984 to Kurdish Alevi parents in Durulova, an apricot farming village in Malatya. His mother was a teacher who taught the first through fifth grades in a one-room schoolhouse.

In 2001, Bali won a silver medal in the International Mathematical Olympiad. The same year, he began his studies at Middle East Technical University, graduating in 2005 with a double major in computer engineering and mathematics.

Career 

In 2008 in Turkey, Bali launched a livestream-based learning platform called KnowBand, which didn’t take off; shortly afterward, however, a Silicon Valley-based online dating company called SpeedDate recruited Bali as an engineer.

In 2010, Bali co-founded Udemy with Oktay Caglar and Gagan Biyani. With initial investments from Russ Fradin and Keith Rabois, they raised one million dollars in seed financing. Between 2010 and 2014, the company grew to 4 million students and 15,000 teachers. In 2014, Bali stepped down as CEO and became the chairman. The same year, he was named on Forbes’ 30 Under 30 list.

Shortly afterward, Bali developed an interest in the healthcare industry when his mother became ill, and he spent some months accompanying her to doctors to get the right diagnosis and treatment. Bali first sought to support healthcare startups as an investor before ultimately deciding to start his own.

In 2015, Bali founded Carbon Health with Tom Berry. In 2016, the founding team expanded to include Pablo Stanley and Greg Burell, MD. In 2018, Carbon Health merged with Direct Urgent Care and added the owner, Caesar Djavaherian as a co-founder.

References

Living people
Turkish Kurdish people
Turkish people of Kurdish descent
Kurdish Alevis
American technology company founders
1984 births
Middle East Technical University alumni